The Barren Gain is a 1915 American silent short drama film directed by Henry Otto and B. Reeves Eason.

Cast
 Charlotte Burton
 Nan Christy
 Teddy Lynch
 Jack Richardson
 Vivian Rich
 Walter Spencer

External links
 

1915 drama films
1915 films
Silent American drama films
American silent short films
American black-and-white films
Films directed by B. Reeves Eason
Films directed by Henry Otto
1915 short films
1910s American films
1910s English-language films
American drama short films